Tooth and nail syndrome (also known as "Hypodontia with nail dysgenesis," and "Witkop syndrome") is a rare disorder, first described in 1965, characterized by nails that are thin, small, and friable, and which may show koilonychia at birth.

It is associated with MSX1.

See also
 Skin lesion
 List of cutaneous conditions

References

External links 

Genodermatoses
Syndromes